Tomás Ó Mellaig, Bishop-elect of Annaghdown, fl. 1329.

Ó Mellaig (O'Mellia, Melia) was Elected circa 1328 or 1329, but never consecrated. He was a kinsman of two previous bishops of Annaghdown, Conn Ua Mellaig (died 1202) and Tomas Ó Mellaig, (c.1242-1247/50). According to the Annals of Loch Cé, Tomas Ua Mellan, espuc Enaigh duin, do ecc h-i cuirt an phapa in hoc anno./Thomas O'Mellain, bishop of Enach-dúin, died at the Pope's court Avignon Papacy in hoc anno [1328].

See also
 Pope John XXII, 1316-1334
 Conn Ua Mellaig, Bishop of Annaghdown, died 1202.
 Tomas Ó Mellaig, Bishop of Annaghdown, c.1242-1247/50.
 Careena Melia, actress.
 Cian Melia, Irish showjumper.

References

 A New History of Ireland: Volume IX - Maps, Genealogies, Lists, ed. T.W. Moody, F.X. Martin, F.J. Byrne, pp. 322–324.

External links
 http://www.ucc.ie/celt/published/G100010A/index.html
 http://www.ucc.ie/celt/published/T100010A/index.html
 http://www.irishtimes.com/ancestor/surname/index.cfm?fuseaction=Go.&UserID=
 http://www.census.nationalarchives.ie/pages/1911/Galway/Galway_North_Urban/Mainguard_St__part_/901714/

Religious leaders from County Mayo 
People from County Galway
13th-century Roman Catholic bishops in Ireland